Whitewater High School may refer to:

 Whitewater High School (Georgia), Fayetteville, Georgia
 Whitewater High School — Whitewater, Kansas, closed, merged with Frederic Remington High School

 Whitewater High School (Wisconsin)